Jim Morris (born February 20, 1950) is the former head baseball coach at the University of Miami and Georgia Tech. His teams qualified for NCAA Regionals for 32 consecutive years, 23 at Miami and nine at Georgia Tech. Morris won national championships in 1999 and 2001, and earned National Coach of the Year honors in both seasons.

Early career
Morris began his coaching career as an assistant at Appalachian State in 1975. In 1976, he accepted the challenge of building, from scratch, a baseball program at Atlanta's DeKalb Community College.

At DeKalb, Morris started with no players and no field, but he quickly made a name for himself. His Eagles were nationally ranked three times in four years and advanced to the 1977 Junior College World Series, where DeKalb placed second. Morris added two more winning years at DeKalb before moving on to become an assistant coach at Florida State.

Georgia Tech
After a two–year stint with the Seminoles, Morris would accept the head coaching job at Georgia Tech. The Yellow Jackets were on the backside of four straight losing seasons and were 4–23 in their first two seasons in the Atlantic Coast Conference. At Georgia Tech, Morris was the all-time leader in coaching victories, in any of the school's varsity sports, as he had 12 straight winning seasons, nine straight NCAA regional berths, four straight Atlantic Coast Conference titles (1985–88) and a school–record 51 wins in 1987.

Miami

In his tenure at the University of Miami, no other program has qualified for the College World Series as often as Morris and his Miami Hurricanes. Miami has qualified for the NCAA Tournament a record 44 consecutive years and made it to Omaha in 11 of Morris' first 15 seasons in Coral Gables. Morris set an NCAA record for guiding a program to the College World Series in each of his first six years at the University of Miami. Morris returned Miami to Omaha in 2015 and 2016 after a seven-year absence. It was announced in June 2014 that Morris would retire following the 2018 season with longtime assistant Gino DiMare as his successor.

Head coaching record

See also
 List of college baseball coaches with 1,100 wins
 List of current NCAA Division I baseball coaches

References

Living people
1950 births
Appalachian State Mountaineers baseball coaches
Florida State Seminoles baseball coaches
Georgia Tech Yellow Jackets baseball coaches
Miami Hurricanes baseball coaches
Junior college baseball coaches in the United States
National College Baseball Hall of Fame inductees